Matthew Marsh (born 24 September 1968 in Welwyn, England) is a British racing driver who now resides in Hong Kong. He is formerly served as a commentator at Fox Sports Asia.

Merdeka Millennium Endurance Race
In August 2003, Marsh was invited by Amprex Motorsport to share the driving duties of the BMW M3 GT with Genji Hashimoto and Charles Kwan in the Merdeka Millennium Endurance Race held at Sepang International Circuit. The team led the race after a fierce battle with BSA Motorsport's Radical SR3 and Porsche 911 GT3 Cup until problems hit. The team finished way down the order.

Porsche Carrera Cup Asia
He became the overall champion of the Porsche Carrera Cup Asia in 2004 when he drove for A-Ha Racing, beating good friend Charles Kwan.

FIA GT Championship

Marsh and Kwan drove for G.P.C Sport at the FIA GT Championship, Zhuhai round in 2004. The two drove a Ferrari 360 in GT2 class and took fourth place in class.

Hong Kong Le Mans Team

Marsh set up the Hong Kong Le Mans Team in 2005 with sponsorship from Noble Group and technical support by GruppeM, with the stated aim of competing at the 24 Hours of Le Mans in 2006. Darryl O'Young joined the team as his co-driver. The team took part in three Le Mans Endurance Series races that year, as well as the FIA GT Championship race at Zhuhai, finishing in fourth position in class.   But the team failed to gain an entry and the project was terminated.

24 Hours of Le Mans
He became the first ever racing driver to represent Hong Kong at the 24 Hours of Le Mans, when he joined G.P.C. Sport to race with Carl Rosenblad and Jesus Diez Villarroel in a Ferrari 430 at the famous French circuit in 2007. The team qualified 52nd overall (11th in class) and retired after 252 laps.

24 Hours of Daytona
Marsh drove a Ferrari 430 in the 24 Hours of Daytona in 2008. He shared car number 56 with 2007 FIA GT champion Thomas Biagi, Christian Montanari from Italy and Spaniard Luis Monzon. The car was run by the Italian Mastercar team. Montanari put the car on the front row of the class grid  but the team retired after 61 laps.

2008 World Touring Car Championship

Marsh drove a BMW 320si for Wiechers-Sport at the 2008 World Touring Car Championship round in Japan and finished 21st and 14th in the two races. He drove again in the finale in Macau, and scored his first championship point and finishing runner-up of the Independents class in the second race at the Macau round.

Post racing career
After retiring from professional motorsports, Matthew Marsh turned to working in both motorsport media and the commercial side of the sport, focusing on maximizing value to new sponsors. He was vice president of partnership development for Asia-Pacific at sports marketing company JMI. He then founded motorsport consultancy Ecurie Drapeau Jaune and became its director.

Racing record

24 Hours of Le Mans results

Complete World Touring Car Championship results
(key) (Races in bold indicate pole position) (Races in italics indicate fastest lap)

External links
Matthew Marsh official twitter
Matthew Marsh official website
Hong Kong Le Mans Team official website
FIA GT Championship Matthew Marsh bio data

References

1968 births
Living people
English racing drivers
Hong Kong racing drivers
FIA GT Championship drivers
24 Hours of Le Mans drivers
World Touring Car Championship drivers
Hong Kong people of British descent
People from Welwyn
24 Hours of Daytona drivers
European Le Mans Series drivers
American Le Mans Series drivers
Rolex Sports Car Series drivers
Porsche Supercup drivers
Porsche Carrera Cup GB drivers
Nürburgring 24 Hours drivers